Åke Ödmark (29 October 1916 – 4 September 1994) was a Swedish high jumper. He finished 12th at the 1936 Summer Olympics and fourth at the 1938 European Athletics Championships. Aged 19 he was the youngest participant from Sweden at the 1936 Games. Ödmark won the Swedish title in 1939 and 1940, and in 1941 became the first Swede to clear the 2.00 m height in an official competition.

References

1916 births
1994 deaths
Swedish male high jumpers
Olympic athletes of Sweden
Athletes (track and field) at the 1936 Summer Olympics
20th-century Swedish people